James Smiddy (born 1974) is an Irish former hurler. At club level he played with Castlemartyr and divisional side Imokilly and at inter-county level was a member of the Cork senior hurling team. Smiddy usually lined out as a forward.

Career

Smiddy first played hurling and Gaelic football at juvenile and underage levels with the Castlemartyr club. He also played in various competitions as a schoolboy with Midleton CBS, including the Harty Cup. Smiddy spent 25 years as a player at adult level with Castlemartyr and won several divisional titles as a dual player before winning a Cork JAHC title in 2014. He also earned selection with the Imokilly divisional team and won consecutive Cork SHC titles in 1997 and 1998. Smiddy first appeared on the inter-county scene as a dual player at minor level. After winning a Munster MFC title, he later won a Munster U21HC title while also lining out with the under-21 football team. Smiddy was part of the Cork junior hurling team that won the Munster JHC title in 1996, the same year he made a number of appearances for the Cork senior hurling team in various tournament and pre-season games. He was part of the Cork intermediate hurling team that beat Galway in the 1997 All-Ireland intermediate final.

Honours
Castlemarty
Cork Junior A Hurling Championship: 2014
East Cork Junior A Football Championship: 1991
East Cork Junior A Hurling Championship: 2009, 2010, 2013, 2014

Imokilly
Cork Senior Hurling Championship: 1997, 1998

Cork
All-Ireland Intermediate Hurling Championship: 1997
Munster Intermediate Hurling Championship: 1997
Munster Junior Hurling Championship: 1996
Munster Under-21 Hurling Championship: 1996
Munster Minor Football Championship: 1992

References

1974 births
Living people
Castlemartyr hurlers
Castlemartyr Gaelic footballers
Cork inter-county hurlers
Dual players
Garda Síochána officers
Imokilly hurlers